Scott Township is one of the fifteen townships of Adams County, Ohio, United States. As of the 2010 census the population was 2,180.

Geography
Located in the northern part of the county, it borders the following townships:
Jackson Township, Highland County - north
Bratton Township - northeast
Meigs Township - east
Oliver Township - southeast
Wayne Township - southwest
Winchester Township - west
Concord Township, Highland County - northwest

Most of the village of Seaman is located in southwestern Scott Township.

Name and history
Statewide, other Scott Townships are located in Brown, Marion, and Sandusky counties.

Scott Township was either named for Edwin Scott, an early settler, or for Thomas Scott, a judge of the Ohio Supreme Court.

Government
The township is governed by a three-member board of trustees, who are elected in November of odd-numbered years to a four-year term beginning on the following January 1. Two are elected in the year after the presidential election and one is elected in the year before it. There is also an elected township fiscal officer, who serves a four-year term beginning on April 1 of the year after the election, which is held in November of the year before the presidential election. Vacancies in the fiscal officership or on the board of trustees are filled by the remaining trustees.

References

External links
County website

Townships in Adams County, Ohio
Townships in Ohio